Babylonia leonis is an extinct species of sea snail, a marine gastropod mollusk, in the family Babyloniidae.

References

leonis
Gastropods described in 1972